Bijan Batmani (born 22 December 1972 in Kermanshah) is an Iranian boxer of Kurdish origin. He competed at the 2000 Summer Olympics in Sydney, in the featherweight.

References

External links
 

1972 births
Living people
People from Kermanshah
Iranian Kurdish people
Kurdish sportspeople
Sportspeople from Kermanshah
Iranian male boxers
Olympic boxers of Iran
Boxers at the 2000 Summer Olympics
Boxers at the 1994 Asian Games
Boxers at the 1998 Asian Games
Asian Games competitors for Iran
Featherweight boxers